Jay Parini (born April 2, 1948) is an American writer and academic. He is known for novels, poetry, biography, screenplays and criticism. He has published novels about Leo Tolstoy, Walter Benjamin, Paul the Apostle, and Herman Melville.

Early life 
Parini was born in Pittston, Pennsylvania, and brought up in Scranton, Pennsylvania. He graduated from Lafayette College in 1970 and was awarded a doctorate by the University of St. Andrews in 1975.

Academia 

He taught at Dartmouth College from 1975 to 1982, and has taught since 1982 at Middlebury College, where he is the D.E. Axinn Professor of English and Creative Writing.

In 1976, Parini co-founded the New England Review with Sydney Lea.

Parini was awarded a Guggenheim Fellowship in 1993. He was the Fowler Hamilton Fellow at Christ Church, Oxford University, in 1993–1994.

He was a fellow of the Institute for Advanced Studies at the University of London in 2005–2006.

He is a member of the Board of Visitors of Ralston College, a liberal arts college in Savannah that was founded in February, 2010.

Writing career

Novels 

Parini has written eight novels, many of which are about the lives of literary icons, and narratives from his own personal life.

His 1990 international best-selling novel The Last Station is about the final months of Leo Tolstoy. It was translated into over thirty languages, and adapted into an Academy Award-nominated film (The Last Station) starring Helen Mirren, Christopher Plummer, James McAvoy, and Paul Giamatti. The film was released in December 2009.

Parini's historical novel Benjamin's Crossing was a New York Times Notable Book of the year in 1997. It is about the Jewish critic and philosopher Walter Benjamin, and his escape over the Pyrenees from Nazi occupied France into Spain. Michael Lackey notes, "Parini brilliantly dramatizes one of Benjamin’s most important contributions to intellectual history, and it is this contribution that would pave the way for the biographical novel."

The Passages of H.M. (2010) explores the literary great Herman Melville.

His most recent novel is The Damascus Road: A Novel of Saint Paul (2019).

Biographies 
 
Parini's biography Robert Frost: A Life won the Chicago Tribune Heartland Prize for best non-fiction book of the year in 2000. He has also written biographies of John Steinbeck, William Faulkner, and Jesus.

His biography One Matchless Time: A Life of William Faulkner was a New York Times Bestseller.

His biography of his longtime friend, the late Gore Vidal, Empire of Self: A Life of Gore Vidal (Doubleday, October 2015), was called "A superbly personal biography that pulsates with intelligence, scholarship, and heart." by Kirkus Reviews. Parini figures prominently in the 2013 documentary film Gore Vidal: The United States of Amnesia.

Non-fiction 
 
He has published non-fiction books on a variety of subjects, including Theodore Roethke, an American Romantic (1980), Some Necessary Angels: Essays on Writing and Politics (1997), The Art of Teaching (2005), Why Poetry Matters (2008), Promised Land: Thirteen Books That Changed America (2008), The Way of Jesus: Living a Spiritual and Ethical Life (2018), and Borges and Me: An Encounter (2020).

Poetry 
His poems have appeared in a wide variety of magazines, including The Atlantic, The New Yorker, and Poetry.

Parini's books of poetry include Singing in Time (1972), Anthracite Country (1982), Town Life (1988), House of Days (1998), The Art of Subtraction: New and Selected Poems (2005), and New and Collected Poems: 1975 - 2015 (2015).

Journalism and media appearances 
Parini is a regular contributor to various journals, websites and newspapers, including The Chronicle of Higher Education, CNN, The Daily Beast, The New York Times, and The Guardian (U.K.). He has written for GQ, The Nation, The Huffington Post, and Salon.com.

Parini has made numerous appearances on film, television and radio, including NPR, PBS, CNN, MSNBC, CBS, C-SPAN, and the BBC.

Film 
Based on his biography Empire of Self: A Life of Gore Vidal (Doubleday, October 2015), Parini co-wrote the screenplay with director Michael Hoffman of the Netflix original film Gore, starring Kevin Spacey as Vidal, Michael Stuhlbarg as Vidal's gay lover Howard Austen and Douglas Booth as "Jamie", a fictional character created for the movie who is a young British writer. The film was filmed in 2017 and was originally due for release in 2018 but that release was cancelled in November 2017 after it was revealed in late October that Spacey had engaged in sexual misconduct. Almost all of Spacey's other projects at the time were either cancelled or had him recast (and in the case of All the Money in the World, even re-filmed with Christopher Plummer replacing him as J. Paul Getty after filming of the original was already complete) owing to this revelation.

With Devon Jersild, Parini adapted his historical novel Benjamin's Crossing into a screenplay, which is currently in pre-production.

Iraq War protest 

Parini, along with Julia Alvarez and Galway Kinnell, was invited to read his poetry at the White House in 2003. However, First Lady Laura Bush canceled the event after learning the poets were intending to protest against the Iraq War. Noelia Rodriguez, a spokeswoman for Mrs. Bush said: “While Mrs. Bush respects the right of all Americans to express their opinions, she, too, has opinions and believes it would be inappropriate to turn a literary event into a political forum.” Parini responded: "For poets to remain silent at a time of national crisis is unconscionable," he said. Fellow poet Julia Alvarez added: "Why be afraid of us, Mrs. Bush? You're married to a scarier fellow." Parini said it was naive for organizers to think he and other poets would check their politics at the door of an event sponsored by the first lady. In response to Mrs. Bush's decision, Parini joined a group of poets that took part in a reading on February 16, 2003, at the Congregational Church in Manchester, Vermont, called "A Poetry Reading in Honor of the Right to Protest as a Patriotic and Historical Tradition". The event was attended by over 700 people, and received national attention, bringing in over 50 reporters and warranting coverage by C-SPAN and 60 Minutes.

In 2010, Parini and Christopher Hitchens debated religion, the invasion of Iraq, and the war on terror at the Pages & Places Book Festival in Scranton, Pennsylvania, which drew more than 2,000 people.

Personal life 

Parini is husband to the writer and psychologist Devon Jersild; they have three sons.

Awards 

Parini has won various fellowships and awards, including a Guggenheim Fellowship in 1993. His novel Benjamin's Crossing was a New York Times Notable Book of the year in 1997. Parini's Robert Frost: A Life won the Chicago Tribune Heartland Prize for best non-fiction book of the year in 2000. He was awarded the John Ciardi Lifetime Achievement Award by the National Italian American Foundation in 2002. He has received honorary degrees from Lafayette College, Sewanee: The University of the South, and the University of Scranton.

Works
Singing in Time (1972) poems
Theodore Roethke, an American Romantic (1979) criticism
The Love Run (1980) novel
Anthracite Country (1982) poems
Bread Loaf Anthology of Contemporary American Poetry (1985) editor with Robert Pack and Sydney Lea
The Patch Boys (1986) novel
An Invitation to Poetry (1987)
The Bread Loaf Anthology of Contemporary American Short Stories (1987) editor with Robert Pack
A Vermont Christmas (1988)
Town Life (1988) poems
The Bread Loaf Anthology of Contemporary American Essays (1989) editor with Robert Pack
The Last Station: A Novel of Tolstoy's Last Year (1990)
Richard Eberhart, New and Selected Poems 1930–1990 (1990) editor
Writers On Writing (1991) with Robert Pack
Bay of Arrows (1992) novel
Gore Vidal: Writer Against the Grain (1992) editor
Poems for a Small Planet: Contemporary American Nature Poetry (1993) editor with Robert Pack
Columbia History of American Poetry (1994) editor
Columbia Anthology of American Poetry (1995) editor
John Steinbeck: A Biography (1995) 
American Identities: Contemporary Multicultural Voices (1996) editor with Robert Pack
Benjamin's Crossing (1996) novel
Touchstones : American Poets on a Favorite Poem (1996) editor with Robert Pack
Some Necessary Angels: Essays on Writing and Politics (1997) essays
Beyond "The Godfather": Italian American Writers on the Real Italian American Experience (1997) editor with A. Kenneth Ciongoli
House of Days (1998) poems
The Norton Book of American Autobiography (1998) editor
Introspections : American Poets on One of Their Own Poems (1998) editor with Robert Pack
Robert Frost: A Life (1999)
American Writers (2000) editor, yearly volumes
American Writers Classics I (2002) II (2004)
The Apprentice Lover (2002) novel
British Writers (2002) editor, yearly
Contemporary Poetry Of New England (2002) editor with Robert Pack
Passage to Liberty: The Story of Italian Immigration and the Rebirth of America (2002) with A. Kenneth Ciongoli
British Writers Classics (2003) editor
The Oxford Encyclopedia of American Literature (2004) editor
World Writers in English (2003) editor
Anthony Quinn's Eye (2004) with Donald Kuspit and Tom Roberts
 One Matchless Time: A Life of William Faulkner (2005)
 The Art of Teaching (2005) criticism
The Art of Subtraction: New and Selected Poems (2005) poems
The Wadsworth Anthology of Poetry (2005) editor
 Why Poetry Matters (2008) criticism
Promised Land: Thirteen Books that Changed America (2008) criticism
The Passages of H.M. (2011) novel about Herman Melville
 Jesus: The Human Face of God (2013) biography
Conversations with Jay Parini (2014) edited by Michael Lackey
Empire of Self: A Life of Gore Vidal (2015) biography
New and Collected Poems 1975 - 2015 (2016) poetry
The Way of Jesus: Living a Spiritual and Ethical Life (2018) 
The Damascus Road: A Novel of Saint Paul (2019) novel
Borges and Me: An Encounter (2020) memoir

References

External links 
 
 Jay Parini: Vermont offers cozy sense of community for culture
 
 Guardian Profile of Jay Parini

Booknotes interview with Parini on Robert Frost: A Life, September 12, 1999.
 On Point with Tom Ashbrook:  (December 22, 2008) 
 (2013 documentary film)
 MSNBC: Morning Joe:  (December 13, 2013)
 PBS Newshour:  (December 25, 2013)

1948 births
Living people
People from Pittston, Pennsylvania
American magazine founders
American male poets
Middlebury College faculty
American humanities academics
Writers from Scranton, Pennsylvania
Lafayette College alumni
Alumni of the University of St Andrews